Hugh Morgan (c.1530–1613) was appointed as Queen Elizabeth I's apothecary in 1583. He is believed to have introduced vanilla to Queen Elizabeth (and Britain) as a flavour in its own right (not just an enhancer for coffee or chocolate as had been used in Europe).

References

External links
 Ownership inscription of Hugh Morgan
 WorldCat

1530 births
1613 deaths
17th-century English people
Vanilla
Court of Elizabeth I